Nymphs is the debut full-length studio album recorded by the American rock band Nymphs. It was produced by Bill Price, and released in 1991 on Geffen Records. There were music videos made for "Imitating Angels" and "Sad and Damned," neither of which attained commercial recognition. Iggy Pop sang on "Supersonic".

Content

Musical style 
Brian Flota of AllMusic proclaimed Nymphs to be "the last great glam-metal album". Dannii Leivers opined the record to "straddle glam and grunge".

Reception 
In June 2020, Nymphs was ranked in LouderSound's "10 Obscure but Absolutely Essential Grunge Albums".

Track listing
All song by Nymphs.

Personnel
Inger Lorre - vocals
Geoff Siegel- guitar
Sam Merrick - guitar
Alex Kirst - drums
Cliff D. - bass
Iggy Pop - vocals on "Supersonic"

References

The Nymphs albums
1991 debut albums
Albums produced by Bill Price (record producer)
Geffen Records albums